Wahiduddin Khan (1 January 1925 – 21 April 2021), known with the honorific "Maulana", was an Indian Islamic scholar and peace activist and author known for having written a commentary on the Quran and having translated it into contemporary English. He was listed in "the 500 Most Influential Muslims" of the world. He was also the founder of the Centre for Peace and Spirituality (CPS). In 1993, he asked the Muslims to relinquish claims over Babri Masjid site. Khan had also embarked on a peace march through Maharashtra along with Sushil Kumar (Jain monk) and Chidanand Saraswati post the demolition of the Babri Masjid. Khan wrote over 200 books on several aspects of Islam and established the Centre for Peace and Spirituality to promote interfaith dialogue.

Khan received the Demiurgus Peace International Award, and India's third-highest civilian honour, the Padma Bhushan, in January 2000; the National Citizens' Award, presented by Mother Teresa and the Rajiv Gandhi National Sadbhavana Award (2009). He was awarded the Padma Vibhushan, India's second-highest civilian honour, in January 2021. He died in Delhi from COVID-19 complications in April 2021 at the age of 96.

Early life and education 
Khan was born a family of Pathan landlords in Village Badharia, in district Azamgarh, Uttar Pradesh, India in 1925. Khan lost his father at the age of four and was raised by his mother Zaibunnisa  and his uncle, Sufi Abdul Hamid Khan. He received his education at a traditional seminary, Madrastaul Islahi, in Sarai Mir (Azamgarh) in 1938. Khan spent six years completing his alim course and graduated in 1944.

He was also a member of the central Majlis-e-Shura of Jamaat-e-Islami, but due to ideological differences, he withdrew from the party in 1963 and published his critique under the name of Tabir Ki Ghalti (Error Of Interpretation).  He was married to Sabi'a Khatoon.

Mission 
Khan launched the 'Maulana Wahiduddin Khan Peace Foundation.'  Khan was among the few Indian scholars to have seriously taken the issue of pluralism and inter-community relations. Khan insisted that Muslims must shed what he called their 'persecution complex'. He insisted on searching for opportunities that exist despite the odds that seem to weigh heavily against them and work along with people of other faiths for building a new society. Khan quoted the Quran as saying: "No one despairs of God's mercy except those who have no faith."

Condemnation of Violence 
Wahiduddin's conception of nonviolence is perhaps best articulated in his treatise, Islam and Peace. Growing up at the height of India's independence movement, Wahiduddin held great admiration for Mohandas Gandhi and expressed his sentiments in his book.

Jamaat-e Islami
His commitment to the Jamaat and his skillful pen helped him move up the Jama'at's hierarchy. He was appointed, in a few years after, as a member of its Central Committee. He even wrote regularly for the Jama'at's Urdu journal.
Khan did not remain for long with the Jama'at, though. Increasingly, it suggested to him that the Jama'at's own agenda, based as it was on working towards establishing what is called an 'Islamic State' in India, was not only impractical but, moreover, not in keeping with what Islam expected of the Muslims of India in the situation that they found themselves. So, he gradually came to the conclusion that the Jama'at-e Islami's political approach was ill-suited to the needs and conditions of the Muslim minority in India. He began airing his differences with the Jama'at's ideology and policies even while still a senior leader of the Jama'at, but as these differences began to grow, he decided to quit the organization after serving it for ten years, in 1962.

Works 
Khan founded the Quran Foundation (under the aegis of CPS International) on April 2, 2015. The aim of the foundation was to translate and disseminate copies of the Quran and Islamic material globally by promoting religious understanding amongst people to reveal 'as it is’ as a religion of peace.

He established the Islamic Centre in New Delhi in 1970. In 2001, Khan established the 'Centre for Peace and Spirituality’.

Thoughts and Ideology

Islam an ideology of peace 
In his book The Ideology of Peace, Khan writes that history abounds with preachers of peace . He says that in centuries no revolution in the true sense of the word has been brought about based on peace. He writes that for peace, the human need is not enough to make him exercise restraint and remain peaceable. Man needs an ideology that convinces him at the conscious level of the necessity to keep the peace at all times. According to Khan, this ideology is the one presented in Islam.

Hudaybiya Model: Peace, Not Justice  
In his book The Prophet of Peace, Khan writes that the greatest fallacy entertained by people of a militant cast of minds is that they think true peace is accompanied by justice. Khan objects to the mentality of “peace without justice is no peace at all.”
Khan says that the life of the Prophet of Islam provides a telling example of this wisdom. 
Khan argues that the Hudaybiya treaty was a biased and unjust peace treaty based on it it’s terms. However, the Prophet of Islam (Muhammad) considered it due to a 10-year no-war pact. It took the form of a written pledge from his opponents that they would not initiate any hostilities against him and that they would let him and his followers live in peace in Madinah. According to Khan, the acceptance of the Hudaybiyah treaty resulted into the success of the Prophet’s mission. Khan writes that justice can only be within discussion after peace is exercised. He writes, “Asking for justice before peace is like placing the cart before the horse.”

Islam and Politics 
Khan disagrees with many of Jamal al-Din al-Afghani ideas. Khan argues that al-Afghani made the notion of a political revolution into a religious duty, a binding obligation, like prayers and fasting. Discrediting the religious credentials of political Islam, Khan writes: "The movement was the result of anti-Western rather than pro-Islam feelings."

Refuting Political Interpretation of Islam 
In time Wahiduddin emerged as a critic of Maududi's Islamist ideas, which he saw as reactionary rather than authentically Islamic. From Khan's perspective, Maududi was treating politics as the center of Islamic activity, when tawhid (the oneness of God) is the actual heart of Islam, and the call to tawhid (Dawah) should be the center of all Islamic activity. His concern has been to demolish the political interpretation of Islam.

He claims that communal Muslim beliefs and practices are in opposition to authentic Islam by citing the Quran as saying that God "is the Lord of the Worlds" and that the Prophet Muhammad is "a mercy to all mankind." Khan's position is that these Quranic references show that God and the Prophet Muhammad are not significant for Muslims only. Hence, looking for the benefit of the Muslim community both in general and specifically through the building of an Islamic state is not the message of the Quran. Instead, the Quranic message and the example of the Prophet Muhammad are for everybody and belong to everyone, not only to the Muslims.

Accepting "political status quo-ism" 
Khan says that the correct attitude towards politics in Islam is "political status quo-ism." Khan says that with political confrontation all the time, our energy will be spent fighting rivals instead of achieving something more productive. Instead, Khan thinks that Islam teaches that: "Politics is not the only important field of human activity. There are many other vital spheres of work, like education, business, industry, social reform, academic learning, scientific research etc." Hence, the principle of "political status quo-ism" means the opposite to a politics of change, or at least radical change or revolution. Another principle is the avoidance of "political movements" and, instead, a pragmatic focus on education, science, and business.

Arguments Against Suicide Bombings 
Khan denounced martyrdom operations as, according to Islam, people can become martyrs, but they cannot court a martyr's death deliberately. He supports his own position on the debate with Surah Al-Anfal (eight chapter of the Quran). In Khan's commentary, he elaborates that the Surah only shows the responsibility to prepare military deterrent defenses as a "demonstration of force." In Khan's words, "the verse offers us a peaceful strategy to counter the enemy." For this reason, he thinks that the Surah only means building a strong defense to deter warfare and attacks.

Existence of God 
Khan believed that there is certainly a scientific basis for belief in the existence of God. But people generally fail to discover it for the simple reason that they try to apply a criterion that they wrongly believe to be scientific. They want a proof in terms of observation, whereas this is neither the scientific method nor the criterion by which to judge. He argues in his book ‘God Arises’ that if one applies the right criterion, they will find that God is a proven fact.

Theme of the Quran: Tadabbur, Tafakkur, Tawassum 
According to Khan, the main themes of the Quran are enlightenment, closeness to God, peace and spirituality. The Quran uses several terms, tawassum, tadabbur, and tafakkur, which indicate the learning of lessons through reflection, thinking and contemplation on the signs of God scattered across the world.

Tazkiyah: Re-engineering of Minds towards Peace and Spirituality 
Khan says that people are born spiritual but the multiple influences from society condition a man’s personality or nurture one based on negative feelings. Khan says, we, therefore, have to consciously activate our mind and de-condition or purify it so as to develop our personality on positive lines as only a positive personality will find entry into paradise.

Khan has laid great emphasis on ‘tazkiyah’ which he has described as “an awakening of the mind or purification or deconditioning that leads to our personality development”.

Muslims and Scientific, Secular Education 
In his paper titled "Muslims and the Scientific Education", Khan addresses the negative perception that Islam discourages Muslims from acquiring scientific education or does nothing to encourage it.

Khan argues that innumerable verses from the Quran and many sayings of the Prophet can be quoted which explicitly urge their readers to delve deeper into the mysteries of the earth and the heavens.

For Khan “making a study of nature is to discover the Creator in His creation”. Khan quotes Muslim history to contradict the supposition that Islam is an obstacle to scientific investigation.

He quotes some achievements of Muslim scientists and doctors in the Middle Ages which he says were indeed surprising because of their tremendous scope.

Pro-Self Activism and Anti-Self Activism 
In his article titled, “Pro-Self Activism, Anti-Self Activism”, Khan writes that in the present age of professionalism, having a profession means living for others.

Khan explains that people live for others and hardly know their own self, for example,  film actors live for their audiences, businessmen for their customers, lawyers for their clients, politicians for their voters, employees for their company bosses, and so on.

This is why Khan says that so many people have become non-self actors which is a great loss for a person, as people almost always remain unaware of themselves. People frequently evaluate themselves according to others’ perceptions and not their own and are unable to unfold their real potential, and finally die in this state of unawareness, writes Khan.

If people are judged on this basis, they can be put into three categories: anti-self activists, non-self activists, and pro-self activists. All persons fall into one or other of these categories, writes Khan.

 He says that the worst case here is of anti-self activists, a term Khan uses to describe people who are embroiled in the gun and bomb culture; individuals who in the name of annihilating the enemy, are actually fighting with their own selves—sometimes in the sense of psychological killing and at other times in the sense of physical killing, explains Khan. According to Khan, violence, or terrorism, is a negation of God’s creation plan for human beings. Indulging in violence means that, instead of properly utilizing one’s capabilities, one is doing nothing but getting oneself and others killed.
 The second category is that of non-self activists. Such people are gravely under-utilizing the potential given to them by their Creator. What they are doing with the gift given to them by the Creator will certainly not be acceptable to Him.
 The third case is that of pro-self activists. These people are performing their roles in accordance with the creation plan of the Creator. These are the people who discover themselves and also the world in which they find themselves. Through study and contemplation, they understand the higher realities and then rightly prepare themselves for the purpose for which the Creator has created them, writes Khan.

Khan concludes with, “People who belong to this pro-self activists category are human beings in the true sense. They make their plans according to the divine scheme of things. They turn their potential into actuality and thus develop themselves.”

Religion and Scientific Reasoning 
In his book ‘Religion and Science’, Khan argues that in the case of scientific truths, the validity of indirect or inferential argument is a matter of general acceptance. Since religious truths are proved by the logic of similar inferential arguments, it may legitimately be argued that they fall into the same intellectual bracket as scientific truths. As science proves any other facts, Wahiduddin Khan claims to prove the truth about religion in his books.

Publications 
The Ar-risala (The Message) Urdu magazine started in 1976, consisting of almost entirely his articles and writing. An English edition of the magazine started in February 1984 and a Hindi version started in December 1990. His articles include 'Hijacking — A Crime', 'Rights of Women in Islam', 'The Concept of Charity in Islam' and 'The Concept of Jihad'.

List of selected works 

He "has authored over 200 books on Islam, inter-faith dialogue, social harmony, freedom of speech, prophetic wisdom, spirituality and coexistence in a multi-ethnic society" as well on Islam's relations with modernity and secularism.: Khan published his first book in 1955, which is Naye Ahd Ke Darwaze Par (On the Threshold of a New Era). His next work, Ilme Jadid Ka Challenge (Islam and Modern Challenges) was later published as God Arises.

His book Al Islam has been published in English as The Vision of Islam. In it, he presents the interpretation of the Islamic Scriptures in the modern idiom based on peace and spirituality.

Tazkirul Quran 
Khan translated the Quran in the modern scientific idiom. He translated the Quran in Urdu along with the commentary entitled Tazkirul Quran. The book is available in Hindi (Pavitra Quran) and Arabic (Al Tazkirul Qaweem fi Tafseeril Quran il Hakeem).

Kitab-e-Marefat 
Khan has presented the counter ideology—an ideology of peace—in articles and books such as The Ideology of Peace, The True Jihad, Islam and Peace, The Prophet of Peace: Teachings of The Prophet Muhammad published by Penguin Books, Islam and World Peace and Political Interpretation of Islam.  He explains the depths of God realization in his book, Kitab-e-Marefat.

Translation of Quran 
Khan with his team translated the Quran and commentary into English, which is published under the title, 'The Quran.' 

"Simple and direct, the book being extremely readable reaches out to a large audience, Muslims as well as non-Muslim … ."— Review of The Quran (English) by the Speaking Tree, Times of India, May 16, 2010

Besides English and Urdu, its translations are now available in Braille (English), German, Spanish, French, Hindi, Marathi, Telugu, and Malayalam and commentary in Arabic, Hindi, Telugu, and Marathi. Efforts are on to translate it into all International and Indian languages.  He is the co-founder of Goodword books, a popular publisher of books on Islam.

Bibliography

English Books 
 A Case Of Discovery
 A Treasury of the Quran
 About the Quran
 Calling People to God
 Concerning Divorce
 Discovering God
 Explore Islam
 God Arises: Evidence of God in Nature and in Science
 Hijab in Islam
 In Search Of God
 Indian Muslims: The Need for a Positive Outlook 
 Introducing Islam: A Simple Introduction to Islam
 Islam and Peace
 Islam and the Modern Man
 Islam and World Peace
 Islam As It Is
 Islam In History
 Islam Pocket Guide
 Islam Rediscovered: Discovering Islam From its Original Sources
 Islam Stands The Test Of History
 Islam: Creator of the Modern Age 
 Islam and Peace
 Islam and World Peace
 Jihad, Peace, and Inter-community Relations in Islam
 Leading a Spiritual Life
 Life Death and Beyond
 Man and God
 Man Know Thyself
 Man Made Global Warming
 Manifesto Of Peace
 Moral Vision 
 Muhammad: The Ideal Character
 Muhammad: A Prophet for All Humanity
 Non-Violence And Islam
 Non-violence and Peace-building in Islam
 Peace in Islam
 Peace in Kashmir
 Peace in the Quran
 Polygamy and Islam
 Principles of Islam
 Prophet Muhammad: A Simple Guide to His Life
 Quran Pocket Guide
 Quran: A Simple English Translation
 Quran Teachings Made Simple
 Quran Teachings Made Simple for Women
 Quranic Wisdom 
 Ramadan Made Simple 
 Religion and Science
 Search For Truth
 Simple Wisdom: A Daybok of Spiritual Living 
 Tabligh Movement
 Tazkiya – The Purification of Soul
 The Alarm of Doomsday
 The Call of the Quran
 The Garden of Paradise
 The Good Life
 The Ideology of Peace: Towards a Culture of Peace
 The Issue of Blasphemy
 The Man Islam Builds
 The Moral Vision
 The Prophet Muhammad: A Simple Guide to His Life
 The Prophet of Peace: Teachings of the Prophet Muhammad
 The Prophet of Peace
 The Purpose of Life
 The Quran: A Simple English Translation
 The Prophetic Role of Noah
 The Reality of Life
 The Revolutionary Role Of Islam
 The Secret of a Successful Family Life
 The Secret of Success
 The Spirit of Salat (Goodword)
 The Seeker's Guide
 The Teachings of Islam
 The True Face of Islam: Essays
 The True Jihad: The Concepts of Peace, Tolerance, and Non-violence in Islam
 The Vision of Islam
 Timeless Wisdom
 Uniform Civil Code
 Woman Between Islam and Western Society
 Woman in Islamic Shari'ah 
 Words of the Prophet Muhammad

Urdu Books 
 Allah-o-Akbar (ALLAH is Greatest)
 Al-Rabbaniah ()
 Amne-Aalam (The peace of Universe)
 Aqliat-e-Islam
 Aqwal-e-Hikmat
 Asbaq-e-Tarikh (The lessons of History)
 Asfar-e-Hind (Travelling in Hind)
 Aurat Mamare Insaniyat
 Azmat-e-Islam
 Azmat-e-Qur'an
 Daur-e-Dawat
 Deen wa Shari'at
 Deen-e-Insaniyat
 Diary Vol. I (83-84)
 Fikr-e-Islami
 Hikmat-e-Islam 
 Islam: Ek Ta'aruf (Islam: An Introduction)
 Islami Taalimaat (Islamic Teachings)
 Karwan-e-Millat
 Khatoon-e-Islam (Woman of Islam)
 Kitab-e-Marifat
 Kitab-e-Zindagi (The Book of Life)
 Mazhab aur Jadid Challenge
 Mutale-Hadith
 Mutale-Qur'an
 Raz-e-Hayat (The Secret of Life)
 Tabir Ki Ghalti (Error Of Interpretation)
 'Tameer-e-Hayat
 Tasweer-e-Millat
 Tazkirul Quran

Hindi Books 

 Paighambar-e-Islam Hazrat Muhammad ka Jiwan
 Tazkirul Quran 
 Quran ki Mahima
 Quran Translation in Hindi

Punjabi Books 

 Islam Ek Swabhik Dharm
 Seerat-e-Rasool
 Sachai di Talaash

Awards and recognition 

 Named as "Islam's spiritual ambassador to the world" in the list of "The 500 Most Influential Muslims", in 2009.
 Padma Bhushan in 2000
 Padma Vibhushan  in 2021
 National Citizens' Award, presented by Mother Teresa
 Rajiv Gandhi National Sadbhavana Award in 2010 
 Demiurgus Peace International Award by former Soviet President Mikhail Gorbachev
 Sayyidina Imam Al Hassan Ibn Ali Peace Award in Abu Dhabi in 2015
 Lifetime achievement award by America's biggest Muslim organization Islamic Society of North America (ISNA)
 The Communal Harmony Award
 The National Amity Award
 The Aruna Asaf Ali Sadbhavna Award
 FIE Foundation Award
 Urdu Academy Award
 Ambassador of Peace award by the International Federation for World Peace in Korea
 The National Integration Award
 The Diwaliben Mohan Lal Mehta Award
 The Dilli Gaurav Award

Death 

Wahiduddin Khan, died on 21 April 2021, ten days after he was admitted to Apollo Hospital in Delhi after he tested positive for coronavirus infection at the age of 96. He was buried at Panjpeeran Qabristan near Basti Hazrat Nizamuddin, New Delhi.

He is survived by two sons and two daughters. His son Zafar ul Islam is the former Chairman of the Delhi Minorities Commission. His other son, Saniyasnain Khan is also a children's book author. His daughter, Farida Khanum, is the translator of most of his books and is the chairperson of Centre for Peace and Spirituality.

See also 
 List of peace activists

References

External links 
 Maulana Wahiduddin Khan on Muslim leadership in contemporary India – TCN News
 Muslims in India since 1947: Islamic perspectives on inter-faith relations
 The Quran, A new translation by Wahiduddin Khan
 Al-Risala Forum International
 Goodword Books
 Centre for Peace and Spirituality
 Saniyasnain Khan 

1925 births
2021 deaths
Activists from Maharashtra
Indian imams
Indian Sunni Muslim scholars of Islam
Indian Islamic religious leaders
Indian Sufi religious leaders
Islamic philosophers
Nonviolence advocates
People from Azamgarh
Recipients of the Padma Bhushan in public affairs
Indian spiritual teachers
Sufi teachers
Translators of the Quran into English
Urdu-language non-fiction writers
Deaths from the COVID-19 pandemic in India
20th-century Indian Muslims
20th-century Indian biographers
20th-century Indian educators
20th-century Indian non-fiction writers
20th-century Indian male writers
20th-century Indian philosophers
21st-century Indian Muslims
21st-century Indian biographers
21st-century Indian educators
21st-century Indian non-fiction writers
21st-century Indian people
21st-century Indian male writers
21st-century Indian philosophers